Olney is the county seat in Richland County, Illinois.  The population was 9,115 at the time of the 2010 census.

History 

Settlement of the Richland County area began around 1815 when Thaddeus Morehouse, a native of Vermont, arrived by wagon and built a log cabin along a stagecoach route that ran from Vincennes, Indiana to St. Louis. This log cabin operated as a hotel and tavern.

Richland County was organized as a county in 1841, when it was formed by a partitioning of Clay and Lawrence counties. There was some controversy regarding the location of the county seat; however, Olney was determined as the choice based on a donation of land and the central location. The name of the town Olney was suggested by Judge Aaron Shaw who desired to honor a friend, Nathan Olney. It was not until 1848 that Olney was incorporated as a village.

The Civil War brought a great deal of turmoil to the county as there were sympathies for both sides. While most citizens rallied around the Union it was necessary to have troops stationed in Olney to enforce the draft as union deserters found refuge among local citizens. Overall, the county was pro-Union and an estimated 1,700 Richland County citizens fought for the Union in the Civil war. Nearly 1,000 Olney residents served in World War I, and during World War II, Richland County may have been the only Illinois county outside of Cook that provided four generals for the war effort.

Among the mayors of Olney was J. B. Porter, noted as an ex-mayor in a 1912 note about his being wounded by gunfire after whipping a man over some unresolved quarrel.

The first census of Richland County was in 1850 at which time 4,012 people resided in the county. One hundred years later the 1950 census found a spot north of Olney near Dundas to be the population center of the United States.

Geography 

Olney is located at  (38.7306, -88.0819).

Climate

Demographics 

As of the census of 2000, there were 8,631 people, 3,755 households, and 2,301 families residing in the city. The racial makeup of the city was 97.67% White, 0.48% African American, 0.16% Native American, 0.64% Asian, 0.03% Pacific Islander, 0.32% from other races, and 0.70% from two or more races. Hispanic or Latino people of any race were 0.96% of the population.

There were 3,755 households, out of which 28.2% had children under the age of 18 living with them, 47.4% were married couples living together, 10.6% had a female householder with no husband present, and 38.7% were non-families. 33.7% of all households were made up of individuals, and 17.3% had someone living alone who was 65 years of age or older. The average household size was 2.26 and the average family size was 2.89.

In the city, the population was spread out, with 23.8% under the age of 18, 9.1% from 18 to 24, 25.6% from 25 to 44, 21.0% from 45 to 64, and 20.5% who were 65 years of age or older. The median age was 39 years. For every 100 females, there were 86.9 males. For every 100 females age 18 and over, there were 82.4 males.

The median income for a household in the city was $28,084 and the median income for a family was $37,365. Males had a median income of $29,547 versus $18,440 for females. The per capita income for the city was $16,218. About 13.0% of families and 17.0% of the population were below the poverty line, including 21.9% of those under age 18 and 8.0% of those age 65 or over.

Government
The City of Olney government consists of a part-time mayor, four city council members, and a full-time city manager. The current mayor is Mark Lambird.

Education

Post-secondary education
 Olney Central College

Notable people 

 Terry L. Bruce, Illinois state senator and United States congressman; born in Olney
 Glenn Brummer, catcher for the St. Louis Cardinals and Texas Rangers
 Glenn Goodart, hotel manager and politician; died in Olney in 1948
 Reginald C. Harmon, first U.S. Air Force judge advocate general; mayor of Urbana, Illinois; born in Olney 
 Butch Lockley, reality television personality known for Survivor: The Amazon
 Herbert Murphy, shortstop for the Philadelphia Phillies; born in Olney
 Ollie Pickering, outfielder for the six Major League Baseball teams; born in Olney
 Stan Royer, infielder for the Boston Red Sox and St. Louis Cardinals; born in Olney
 Elaine Shepard, actress; born in Olney

Media 

Olney is served by the Olney Gazette, a weekly newspaper founded in 2017.

WUSI-TV (Channel 16) is licensed to Olney. Its studio and transmitter are located outside of town. WUSI-TV is a PBS affiliate operated by the Broadcasting Service of Southern Illinois University.

References

External links 

Cities in Richland County, Illinois
Cities in Illinois
County seats in Illinois
Populated places established in 1848
1848 establishments in Illinois